Handa may refer to:

Places
Handa, Aichi, Japan
Handa, Tokushima, Japan
Handa Island, Scotland

Other uses
Handa (surname), a Japanese surname
Handa, a khatri (kashtriya) surname 

Handa or Katanga Cross, a copper ingot once used as currency in the Democratic Republic of the Congo

See also